"Back for More" is a song by American heavy metal band Five Finger Death Punch. It was released as the second single from their third album, American Capitalist. In October 2011, the song ranked third on the Billboard Hard Rock Digital Songs chart and 20th on the Billboard Rock Digital Songs chart.

The song is included on the soundtrack for the video game Madden NFL 12.

Track listing

Personnel
 Zoltan Bathory – guitars
 Jason Hook – guitars, backing vocals
 Ivan Moody – vocals
 Chris Kael – bass, backing vocals
 Jeremy Spencer – drums

References

External links
 

Five Finger Death Punch songs
2011 singles
2011 songs
Song recordings produced by Kevin Churko
Songs written by Kevin Churko
Songs written by Zoltan Bathory
Songs written by Ivan Moody (vocalist)
Songs written by Jason Hook
Songs written by Jeremy Spencer (drummer)

es:American Capitalist